is a Japanese cross-country skier. He competed at the 1960 Winter Olympics, the 1964 Winter Olympics and the 1968 Winter Olympics.

References

1937 births
Living people
Japanese male cross-country skiers
Olympic cross-country skiers of Japan
Cross-country skiers at the 1960 Winter Olympics
Cross-country skiers at the 1964 Winter Olympics
Cross-country skiers at the 1968 Winter Olympics
Sportspeople from Nagano Prefecture
20th-century Japanese people